Blockbleeders is a compilation album by the American underground rap group Screwed Up Click. It was released on May 18, 1999 via Straight Profit Records. Recording sessions took place at Top Notch Studios and Uptown Recording Studio in Houston, Texas.

Track listing 
 "Commercial Intro" – performed by Denden & Solo D
 "Pimping Pens & Blessing Pads" – performed by Yungstar, C-Nile, E-Clarke, Solo D & DatBoy Grace
 "Southwest Soldier" – performed by Solo D & Datboy Grace
 "Gots To Be Everything" – performed by 2-Low, Lil' James, Denden & Yungstar
 "Key Kars & Killers" – performed by C-Nile & Sean Blaze
 "Sex Money & Drugs" – performed by Solo D, 3-2 & DatBoy Grace
 "La Dochavilla" – performed by C-Nile & Denden
 "Let's Get It Together" – performed by Solo D, T-Pop, Yungstar & DatBoy Grace
 "Golden Child" – performed by C-Nile
 "No Exit" – performed by E-Clarke & Crooks
 "I'm So Throwed" – performed by Dat Boy Grace, Denden, Lil' James, Solo D & E-Clarke
 "Finer Things In Life" – performed by C-Nile
 "State To State" – performed by Solo D, C-Nile, Crooks, Denden, Shorty D, DatBoy Grace, Woody Wood, L.O.S., E-Clarke & Black One
 "Commercial Outro" – performed by Denden

References

External links

1999 debut albums
1999 compilation albums
Screwed Up Click albums